Ertela is a genus of flowering plants belonging to the family Rutaceae.

Its native range is Southwestern Mexico, Southern Tropical America.

Species:

Ertela bahiensis 
Ertela trifolia

References

Rutaceae
Rutaceae genera